The discography of Australian rock group Midnight Oil consists of thirteen studio albums, forty-three singles, two EPs, five video albums, five live albums, and six compilation albums. The band have sold over 20 million albums.

Midnight Oil began under the name Farm in 1972, establishing their own record label 'Powderworks' in 1977. They released their debut self-titled album Midnight Oil in 1978 along with their first single "Run by Night". Their first three albums charted in the top 50 of the Australian Kent Music Report; in Australia, Head Injuries was certified gold and Place without a Postcard was certified platinum.

Their fourth album was their first to reach the top 10; 10, 9, 8, 7, 6, 5, 4, 3, 2, 1 (1982) peaked at number three in Australia pushing them to the level of mainstream recognition locally. It also brought their first appearance on the United States charts, peaking at number 178 on the Billboard 200. The album's first single, "Power and the Passion", was their first top ten single in Australia, at number eight. In 1984, Midnight Oil's Red Sails in the Sunset became their first number one album in Australia. It was the first of four in a row between 1984 and 1993. 1985 saw the release of the EP Species Deceases – the group's only number one entry on the Australian singles chart – which features the anti-war song "Hercules" and the environmentalist anthem "Pictures".

"The Dead Heart" in 1986 became the band's highest-charting Australian single, peaking at number four. It was followed by "Beds Are Burning" at number six, with both singles from the 1987 album Diesel and Dust which edged them into mainstream global recognition. In addition to number one in Australia, Diesel and Dust peaked at number 20 on the United Kingdom Albums Chart; it was certified platinum in the US and three times platinum in Canada. Midnight Oil followed up the success of Diesel and Dust with their seventh studio album Blue Sky Mining in 1990. It was their first and only to peak in the top 20 of the Billboard 200. It brought the single "Blue Sky Mine", which charted at number one on both the US Mainstream and Modern Rock charts. The second single "Forgotten Years" also charted at number one on the Modern Rock chart. Their last Australian number one studio album was Earth and Sun and Moon, bringing another three top ten singles on the US Modern Rock charts.

In the next decade, Midnight Oil released three further studio albums, all of which registered on the top ten in Australia, but did not match the success of their earlier efforts. In 1997, the band released the greatest hits album 20,000 Watt R.S.L., which has since achieved four times platinum sales in Australia. In 2002, lead vocalist Peter Garrett announced his decision to leave Midnight Oil, concluding the band's 30-year career. The group reformed in 2017.

Albums

Studio albums

Compilation albums

Live albums

Box sets

Extended plays

Singles

Notes

A "The Dead Heart" and "Beds Are Burning" were both released in United States and United Kingdom in 1988 
B "The Dead Heart" peaked at number 62 in 1989 after its re-release in the UK; its first release originally peaked at number 68
C "Beds Are Burning" peaked at number 6 in 1989 after its re-release in the UK; its first release originally peaked at number 48

Notes

Video albums

Music videos

Notes

A These clips were filmed at the Channel Seven television station in Sydney and have no attributable director.
B The name of the Director for these music videos has not been found in reliable sources.
C These clips were filmed for the TV series Live at the Chapel. on 12 February 2002. They were included on a Special Edition release of Capricornia.

Other appearances

References

General
 
 
 

Specific

External links

Discography
Rock music group discographies
Discographies of Australian artists